Joe-Max Moore (born February 23, 1971) is an American former soccer player. He played professionally for clubs in Germany, England and the United States. He finished his career with the New England Revolution of Major League Soccer. In addition to his club career, Moore earned 100 caps, scoring 24 goals, for the U.S. national team between 1992 and 2002. During those years, he was part of U.S. teams at the 1992 Summer Olympics and the 1994, 1998 and 2002 FIFA World Cups.

On April 4, 2013, Moore was elected to the U.S. Soccer Hall of Fame.

Early life
Moore was born in Tulsa, Oklahoma, the son of Corey Moore, and Tulsa oil man and business man, Carl Moore. Moore's father also happened to be a part-owner of the Tulsa Roughnecks of the North American Soccer League. He moved to Irvine, California when he was 14, and played boys' soccer at Mission Viejo High School where he was a four-year starter. Heavily recruited out of high school, he chose to play NCAA soccer at UCLA.  While at UCLA, he played with future national team teammates Brad Friedel, Chris Henderson and Cobi Jones.  As a freshman, he scored 11 goals, assisted on ten others and was named to the Soccer America Magazine's All-Freshman team.  That year, UCLA won the NCAA championship, defeating Rutgers in penalty kicks.  As a sophomore, he earned second team All-American honors and was a first team All-American as a junior.  That season, his final year with UCLA, he led the team in scoring.  At the end of his three-year collegiate career, he had scored a total of 38 goals and assisted on 24 others in 65 games.

Moore was inducted into the UCLA Athletics Hall of Fame on October 11, 2014.

Career

Years in Germany
In July 1994, USSF loaned Moore to German Second Division club 1. FC Saarbrücken. At the time, Moore was a part of the U.S. team at the 1994 FIFA World Cup, but did not appear in any matches.  With a lull in national team games following the World Cup, USSF decided to move several players overseas. Saarbrücken  would end up buying Moore's contract from USSF for $250,000. In Moore's single season with Saarbrücken, he played 25 games, leading the club with 13 goals. At the end of the season, Saarbrücken transferred Moore to fellow Second Division club 1. FC Nürnberg. He again led his team in scoring with eight goals.

New England Revolution
In 1996, Major League Soccer (MLS) was in the process of building teams for its upcoming first season.  As part of that process, MLS attempted to ensure an initial equitable distribution of talent across each of its teams.  It did this by allocating known players to each team.  MLS allocated Giuseppe Galderisi to the New England Revolution.  However, he showed up injured and played poorly through his first four games, so MLS replaced him with Moore on the Revolution roster on July 24, 1996.

Moore had an exceptional four-year tour with the Revolution.  Aside from an injury marred 1997 season, in which he only played 11 games, scoring four goals, he consistently produced for the club.  During these years, he became the club's all-time leading scorer and made the 1999 MLS All Star team.  His success with the Revs led him to pursue a return to Europe, this time with Everton in the English Premiership.

Emelec
In November–December 1997, Moore spent a month on loan from the Revs to Emelec of the Ecuadorian First Division following the end of the MLS season where he yearned to be close to his family recently residing in Tulsa, Oklahoma.  He was not the only MLS player with Emelec, as Alexi Lalas joined him during the loan.

Everton
In November 1999, Moore went to Everton, in the English Premiership, after he impressed the Everton staff during a seven-day October tryout.  At the time, Moore did not have permission from MLS to work out with any team but the Revolution.  Despite this, MLS placed no barriers in the way of Moore's free transfer.  The contract with Everton, good for three and a half years, would pay Moore approximately $600,000 per season.

Moore initially had outstanding success with Everton, scoring five goals in his first five first-team games.  However, he slowly became less and less effective.  The final straw came at the end of 2002.  Moore had suffered a knee injury in the U.S. game against Portugal at the 2002 FIFA World Cup and did not play for Everton in the next season.  On December 12, 2002 his contract with Everton terminated "by mutual consent".

Return to the Revolution
When he returned to New England from Everton in 2003, he was a much changed player.  He had suffered from several injuries while in England which hampered his playing time when he came back to the Revs.  However, he still managed to score four goals in 16 games during the 2003 season.  In 2004, his last season with the team, he played in only three games, failing to score a goal, before spraining ligaments in his knee.  He was out for most of the rest of the season, but planned to return for the 2005 season.  However, he re-injured his knee during a January 2005 pre-season mini-camp.

Moore had reconstructive surgery on his right knee for a damaged medial collateral ligament on January 25, 2005.  Two days later, he announced his retirement from professional soccer, saying, "After numerous attempts to strengthen and stabilize my knee through rehab, it became clear that I had no alternative but to have reconstructive surgery. Considering my age and the recovery time necessary, I have decided to end my playing career."

In his six years in MLS, Moore scored 41 goals and added 35 assists for 111 points, the assists and points being Rev records through the 2004 season.  However, Taylor Twellman has since passed Moore on the Rev's points lists.

National team
While in college, he began playing for the national team.  In 1989, he was part of the U.S. U-20 team which placed fifth at the 1989 FIFA U-20 World Cup.  In 1991, he scored the winning goal against Mexico in the Pan American Games championship game.  In 1992, he was a member of the U.S. Olympic team which went 1–1–1 and failed to make the second round.

After the 1992 college season ended, Moore signed with the U.S. national team.  Beginning in 1988, the United States Soccer Federation (USSF) had begun to sign top U.S. players to contracts, making the U.S. national team a de facto professional club.  USSF would then loan out U.S. players to club team, recalling them for national team games.  Moore chose to not return to UCLA for his senior year and joined USSF as a full-time national team player.

Moore's first appearance for the US national team came against Canada on September 3, 1992. He was part of the U.S. roster for the 1994 but didn't appear in a match and also the 1998, 2002 FIFA World Cup rosters, appearing in both tournaments. Moore became the sixth U.S. player to earn 100 caps, doing so against Poland in the team's 2002 World Cup group finale.

His 24 goals for the U.S. rank him sixth in national history, behind Landon Donovan, Clint Dempsey, Eric Wynalda, Brian McBride and Jozy Altidore. On January 27, 2006, Moore was inducted into the Oklahoma Soccer Hall of Fame.

Year-by-Year National Team Appearances/Goals
As of match played June 14, 2002.

International goals

Charitable activities
Moore was to appear in a charity match for Hollywood United FC against Los Angeles Galaxy on November 4, 2007. Proceeds were to go the American Red Cross and The Salvation Army to benefit those affected by the wildfires in Southern California.

Popular Culture
A non-alcoholic drink has been named after Moore.  In the spirit of the Arnold Palmer, the Joe-Max Moore is simply half Sprite and half Fanta Orange mixed in the same glass.  The concoction was invented at the 2022 Jefferson Cup soccer tournament in and around Richmond, Virginia by players participating in the tournament.  Its origin is credited to Jack Martin, a standout midfielder from Massachusetts, who was the first to create one at a soda fountain.  By the end of the tournament the drink was being consumed almost exclusively by players at mealtimes, and has continued to spread up and down the east coast.

See also
 List of men's footballers with 100 or more international caps

References

1971 births
Living people
Sportspeople from Tulsa, Oklahoma
Sportspeople from Orange County, California
American soccer players
United States men's international soccer players
All-American men's college soccer players
American expatriate soccer players
American expatriate soccer players in Germany
American expatriate sportspeople in England
Expatriate footballers in England
Expatriate footballers in Ecuador
UCLA Bruins men's soccer players
1. FC Saarbrücken players
1. FC Nürnberg players
New England Revolution players
C.S. Emelec footballers
Everton F.C. players
2. Bundesliga players
Major League Soccer players
Premier League players
Soccer players from California
Soccer players from Oklahoma
Olympic soccer players of the United States
Footballers at the 1992 Summer Olympics
1993 Copa América players
1993 CONCACAF Gold Cup players
1994 FIFA World Cup players
1995 Copa América players
1996 CONCACAF Gold Cup players
1998 CONCACAF Gold Cup players
1998 FIFA World Cup players
1999 FIFA Confederations Cup players
2002 FIFA World Cup players
FIFA Century Club
Major League Soccer All-Stars
United States men's youth international soccer players
United States men's under-20 international soccer players
United States men's under-23 international soccer players
Association football forwards
Pan American Games gold medalists for the United States
Pan American Games medalists in football
National Soccer Hall of Fame members
Footballers at the 1991 Pan American Games
NCAA Division I Men's Soccer Tournament Most Outstanding Player winners
Medalists at the 1991 Pan American Games
Mission Viejo High School alumni